Mario Vicente Jara (born 25 April 1980) is an Argentine football manager and former player who played as a midfielder.

Playing career
Born in Formosa, Jara made his senior debut in 2002 with Juventud Unida. In 2006, after representing local sides Leandro N. Alem and Flandria, he moved to Paraguay with 2 de Mayo.

In 2009, Jara joined Olimpia, but featured sparingly. In January 2010, he agreed to a move to Sportivo Luqueño, but did not sign for the club after failing a medical,

On 9 December 2010, Jara moved to Brazil and signed for Santo André for the 2011 campaign. For the 2012 season, he represented Brazilian sides Osvaldo Cruz, Lagarto before returning to his home country with Barracas Central.

In 2013, after playing for El Porvenir, Jara retired.

Managerial career
In April 2015, Jara was named manager of former club General Díaz. He resigned in August, and took over fellow league team Deportivo Santaní in September.

On 17 December 2015, Jara was appointed Rubio Ñu manager for the 2016 campaign, but resigned the following 2 October. Fourteen days after leaving Rubio Ñu, he took over another former club, Sportivo Luqueño, leaving the latter at the end of the season.

In April 2017, Jara took over División Intermedia side 22 de Septiembre before returning to General Díaz in October. On 6 December, after receiving public criticism from the club's president, he resigned.

Jara returned to Santaní on 15 March 2018, but was sacked on 26 August. On 4 November, he was appointed at the helm of Independiente de Campo Grande.

In May 2019, Jara left Independiente to take over Deportivo Capiatá. Sacked on 25 August, he returned to Santaní for a third spell on 2 September.

Jara resigned on 28 October 2019, only returning to club duties the following 21 February with 12 de Octubre. He was sacked by the latter on 13 November 2020, being later appointed manager of River Plate Asunción on 21 December.

On 9 March 2021, Jara resigned. During the 2022 season, he was in charge of 2 de Mayo in the second division, and later Resistencia in the top tier.

References

External links

1980 births
Living people
People from Formosa, Argentina
Argentine footballers
Association football midfielders
Juventud Unida de San Miguel players
Club Leandro N. Alem players
Flandria footballers
2 de Mayo footballers
Club Olimpia footballers
General Díaz footballers
Sportivo Patria footballers
Esporte Clube Santo André players
Lagarto Futebol Clube players
América Futebol Clube (PE) players
Barracas Central players
El Porvenir footballers
Argentine expatriate footballers
Argentine expatriate sportspeople in Paraguay
Argentine expatriate sportspeople in Brazil
Expatriate footballers in Paraguay
Expatriate footballers in Brazil
Argentine football managers
Paraguayan Primera División managers
Argentine expatriate football managers
Expatriate football managers in Paraguay
12 de Octubre Football Club managers
Resistencia S.C. managers
Sportivo Luqueño managers
Deportivo Capiatá managers
Club General Díaz (Luque) managers
Deportivo Santaní managers
Independiente F.B.C. managers